Laem Tanot railway station is a railway station located in Laem Tanot Subdistrict, Khuan Khanun District, Phatthalung.

Train services 
 Rapid No. 169/170 krungthep Apiwat Central Terminal - Yala - krungthep Apiwat Central Terminal 
 Local No. 445/446 Chumphon-Hat Yai Junction-Chumphon
 Local No. 447/448 Surat Thani-Sungai Kolok-Surat Thani
 Local No. 451/452 Nakhon Si Thammarat-Sungai Kolok-Nakhon Si Thammarat
 Local No. 455/456 Nakhon Si Thammarat-Yala-Nakhon Si Thammarat
 Local No. 457/458 Nakhon Si Thammarat-Phatthalung-Nakhon Si Thammarat ( Terminated since 1 October 2015 )

References 
 
 

Railway stations in Thailand